Psilogramma is a genus of moths in the family Sphingidae.

Species

Psilogramma andamanica Brechlin, 2001
Psilogramma angelika Eitschberger, 2004
Psilogramma anne Eitschberger, 2001
Psilogramma argos Moulds & Lane, 1999
Psilogramma bartschereri Eitschberger, 2001
Psilogramma baueri Eitschberger, 2001
Psilogramma casuarinae (Walker, 1856)
Psilogramma choui Eitschberger, 2001
Psilogramma danneri Eitschberger, 2001
Psilogramma dantchenkoi Eitschberger, 2001
Psilogramma dillerorum Eitschberger, 2001
Psilogramma discistriga (Walker, 1856)
Psilogramma edii Eitschberger, 2001
Psilogramma exigua Brechlin, Lane & Kitching, 2010
Psilogramma floresica Brechlin, 2001
Psilogramma frankenbachi Eitschberger, 2001
Psilogramma gerstmeieri Eitschberger, 2001
Psilogramma gloriosa Eitschberger, 2001
Psilogramma hainanensis Eitschberger, 2001
Psilogramma hauensteini Eitschberger, 2001
Psilogramma hayati Eitschberger, 2004
Psilogramma increta (Walker, 1865)
Psilogramma japonica Eitschberger, 2001
Psilogramma joachimi (Clark, 1926)
Psilogramma jordana Bethune-Baker, 1905
Psilogramma kitchingi Brechlin & Lachlan, 2001
Psilogramma kleineri Eitschberger, 2001
Psilogramma koalae Eitschberger, 2001
Psilogramma lifuense (Rothschild, 1894)
Psilogramma lukhtanovi Eitschberger, 2001
Psilogramma macromera (Butler, 1882)
Psilogramma makirae Brechlin & Kitching, 2010
Psilogramma mandarina Eitschberger, 2001
Psilogramma manusensis Brechlin & Kitching, 2010
Psilogramma maxmouldsi Eitschberger, 2001
Psilogramma medicieloi Eitschberger, 2001
Psilogramma menephron (Cramer, 1780)
Psilogramma monastyrskii Eitschberger, 2001
Psilogramma nebulosa Butler, 1876
Psilogramma orientalis Brechlin, 2001
Psilogramma papuensis Brechlin, 2001
Psilogramma paukstadtorum Eitschberger, 2001
Psilogramma penumbra Lane, Moulds & Tuttle, 2011
Psilogramma reinhardti Eitschberger, 2001
Psilogramma renneri Eitschberger, 2001
Psilogramma rupprechtorum Eitschberger, 2001
Psilogramma salomonis Brechlin, 2001
Psilogramma stameri Eitschberger, 2001
Psilogramma sulawesica Brechlin, 2001
Psilogramma sundana Brechlin, 2001
Psilogramma surholti Eitschberger, 2001
Psilogramma tanimbarica Brechlin, 2001
Psilogramma timorica Brechlin & Kitching, 2010
Psilogramma ulrichroesleri Eitschberger, 2004
Psilogramma vanuatui Eitschberger & Schmidl, 2007
Psilogramma vates (Butler, 1875)
Psilogramma villani Kitching, Treadaway & Hogenes, 2000
Psilogramma wannanensis Meng, 1990
Psilogramma wernerbacki Eitschberger, 2010
Psilogramma wetarensis Brechlin, 2001
Psilogramma yilingae Eitschberger, 2001

References

 
Sphingini
Moth genera
Taxa named by Walter Rothschild
Taxa named by Karl Jordan